Saeed Anwar (October 14, 1943 – July 15, 2004) was a Pakistani field hockey player. He was born in Sheikhupura. He won a gold medal at the 1968 Summer Olympics in Mexico City, and silver at the 1964 and 1972 Summer Olympics.

References

External links
 

1943 births
2004 deaths
Pakistani male field hockey players
Olympic field hockey players of Pakistan
Olympic gold medalists for Pakistan
Olympic silver medalists for Pakistan
Olympic medalists in field hockey
Medalists at the 1964 Summer Olympics
Medalists at the 1968 Summer Olympics
Medalists at the 1972 Summer Olympics
Field hockey players at the 1964 Summer Olympics
Field hockey players at the 1968 Summer Olympics
Field hockey players at the 1972 Summer Olympics
Asian Games medalists in field hockey
Field hockey players at the 1966 Asian Games
Field hockey players at the 1970 Asian Games
Field hockey players from Sheikhupura
Asian Games gold medalists for Pakistan
Asian Games silver medalists for Pakistan
Medalists at the 1966 Asian Games
Medalists at the 1970 Asian Games
20th-century Pakistani people